Enrique Nieto may refer to:

Enrique Nieto (architect) (1880/83–1954), Catalan architect
Enrique Peña Nieto (born 1966), President of Mexico